A thermographic camera (also called an infrared camera or thermal imaging camera, thermal camera or thermal imager) is a device that creates an image using infrared (IR) radiation, similar to a normal camera that forms an image using visible light. Instead of the 400–700 nanometre (nm) range of the visible light camera, infrared cameras are sensitive to wavelengths from about 1,000 nm (1 micrometre or μm) to about 14,000 nm (14 μm). The practice of capturing and analyzing the data they provide is called thermography.

History

Discovery and research of infrared radiation 
Infrared was discovered in 1800 by Sir William Herschel as a form of radiation beyond red light. These "infrared rays" (infra is the Latin prefix for "below") were used mainly for thermal measurement. There are four basic laws of IR radiation: Kirchhoff's law of thermal radiation, Stefan–Boltzmann law, Planck's law, and Wien's displacement law. The development of detectors was mainly focused on the use of thermometers and bolometers until World War I. A significant step in the development of detectors occurred in 1829, when Leopoldo Nobili, using the Seebeck effect, created the first known thermocouple, fabricating an improved thermometer, a crude thermopile. He described this instrument to Macedonio Melloni. Initially, they jointly developed a greatly improved instrument. Subsequently, Melloni worked alone, creating an instrument in 1833 (a multielement thermopile) that could detect a person 10 metres away. The next significant step in improving detectors was the bolometer, invented in 1880 by Samuel Pierpont Langley. Langley and his assistant Charles Greeley Abbot continued to make improvements in this instrument. By 1901, it could detect radiation from a cow from 400 metres away and was sensitive to differences in temperature of one hundred thousandths (0.00001 C) of a degree Celsius. The first commercial thermal imaging camera was sold in 1965 for high voltage power line inspections.

The first advanced application of IR technology in the civil section may have been a device to detect the presence of icebergs and steamships using a mirror and thermopile, patented in 1913. This was soon outdone by the first accurate IR iceberg detector, which did not use thermopiles, patented in 1914 by R.D. Parker. This was followed by G.A. Barker's proposal to use the IR system to detect forest fires in 1934. The technique was not genuinely industrialized until it was used to analyze heating uniformity in hot steel strips in 1935.

First thermographic camera 
In 1929, Hungarian physicist Kálmán Tihanyi invented the infrared-sensitive (night vision) electronic television camera for anti-aircraft defense in Britain. The first American thermographic camera developed was an infrared line scanner. This was created by the US military and Texas Instruments in 1947 and took one hour to produce a single image. While several approaches were investigated to improve the speed and accuracy of the technology, one of the most crucial factors dealt with scanning an image, which the AGA company was able to commercialize using a cooled photoconductor.

The first infrared linescan system was the British Yellow Duckling of the mid-1950s. This used a continuously rotating mirror and detector, with Y-axis scanning by the motion of the carrier aircraft. Although unsuccessful in its intended application of submarine tracking by wake detection, it was applied to land-based surveillance and became the foundation of military IR linescan.

This work was further developed at the Royal Signals and Radar Establishment in the UK when they discovered that mercury cadmium telluride was a photoconductor that required much less cooling. Honeywell in the United States also developed arrays of detectors that could cool at a lower temperature, but they scanned mechanically. This method had several disadvantages which could be overcome using an electronic scanning system. In 1969 Michael Francis Tompsett at English Electric Valve Company in the UK patented a camera that scanned pyro-electronically and which reached a high level of performance after several other breakthroughs during the 1970s. Tompsett also proposed an idea for solid-state thermal-imaging arrays, which eventually led to modern hybridized single-crystal-slice imaging devices.

Smart sensors 
One of the essential areas of development for security systems was for the ability to intelligently evaluate a signal, as well as warning of a threat's presence. Under the encouragement of the US Strategic Defense Initiative, "smart sensors" began to appear. These are sensors that could integrate sensing, signal extraction, processing, and comprehension. There are two main types of smart sensors. One, similar to what is called a "vision chip" when used in the visible range, allow for preprocessing using smart sensing techniques due to the increase in growth of integrated microcircuitry. The other technology is more oriented to specific use and fulfills its preprocessing goal through its design and structure.

Towards the end of the 1990s, the use of infrared was moving towards civilian use. There was a dramatic lowering of costs for uncooled arrays, which along with the significant increase in developments, led to a dual-use market encompassing both civilian and military uses. These uses include environmental control, building/art analysis, functional medical diagnostics, and car guidance and collision avoidance systems.

Theory of operation 

Infrared energy is just one part of the electromagnetic spectrum, which encompasses radiation from gamma rays, x-rays, ultraviolet, a thin region of visible light, infrared, terahertz waves, microwaves, and radio waves. These are all related and differentiated in the length of their wave (wavelength). All objects emit a certain amount of black body radiation as a function of their temperature.

Generally speaking, the higher an object's temperature, the more infrared radiation is emitted as black-body radiation. A special camera can detect this radiation in a way similar to the way an ordinary camera detects visible light. It even works in total darkness because ambient light level does not matter. This makes it useful for rescue operations in smoke-filled buildings and underground.

A major difference with optical cameras is that the focusing lenses cannot be made of glass, as glass blocks long-wave infrared light. Typically the spectral range of thermal radiation is from 7 to 14 μm. Special materials such as Germanium, calcium fluoride, crystalline silicon or newly developed special type of chalcogenide glasses must be used. Except for calcium fluoride all these materials are quite hard and have high refractive index (for germanium n=4) which leads to very high Fresnel reflection from uncoated surfaces (up to more than 30%). For this reason most of the lenses for thermal cameras have antireflective coatings. The higher cost of these special lenses is one reason why thermographic cameras are more expensive.

In use 

Images from infrared cameras tend to be monochrome because the cameras generally use an image sensor that does not distinguish different wavelengths of infrared radiation. Color image sensors require a complex construction to differentiate wavelengths, and color has less meaning outside of the normal visible spectrum because the differing wavelengths do not map uniformly into the system of color vision used by humans.

Sometimes these monochromatic images are displayed in pseudo-color, where changes in color are used rather than changes in intensity to display changes in the signal. This technique, called density slicing, is useful because although humans have much greater dynamic range in intensity detection than color overall, the ability to see fine intensity differences in bright areas is fairly limited.

For use in temperature measurement the brightest (warmest) parts of the image are customarily colored white, intermediate temperatures reds and yellows, and the dimmest (coolest) parts black. A scale should be shown next to a false color image to relate colors to temperatures. Their resolution is considerably lower than that of optical cameras, mostly only 160 x 120 or 320 x 240 pixels, although more expensive cameras can achieve a resolution of 1280 x 1024 pixels. Thermographic cameras are much more expensive than their visible-spectrum counterparts, though low-performance add-on thermal cameras for smartphones became available for hundreds of dollars in 2014. Higher-end models are often deemed dual-use military grade equipment, and are export-restricted, particularly if the resolution is 640 x 480 or greater, unless the refresh rate is 9 Hz or less. The export of thermal cameras is regulated by International Traffic in Arms Regulations. A thermal camera was first built into a smartphone in 2016, into the Cat S60.

In uncooled detectors the temperature differences at the sensor pixels are minute; a 1 °C difference at the scene induces just a 0.03 °C difference at the sensor. The pixel response time is also fairly slow, at the range of tens of milliseconds.

Thermography finds many other uses. For example, firefighters use it to see through smoke, find people, and localize hotspots of fires. With thermal imaging, power line maintenance technicians locate overheating joints and parts, a telltale sign of their failure, to eliminate potential hazards. Where thermal insulation becomes faulty, building construction technicians can see heat leaks to improve the efficiencies of cooling or heating air-conditioning.

Thermal imaging cameras are also installed in some luxury cars to aid the driver (automotive night vision), the first being the 2000 Cadillac DeVille.

Some physiological activities, particularly responses such as fever, in human beings and other warm-blooded animals can also be monitored with thermographic imaging. Cooled infrared cameras can be found at major astronomy research telescopes, even those that are not infrared telescopes.

Types 

Thermographic cameras can be broadly divided into two types: those with cooled infrared image detectors and those with uncooled detectors.

Cooled infrared detectors 

Cooled detectors are typically contained in a vacuum-sealed case or Dewar and cryogenically cooled. The cooling is necessary for the operation of the semiconductor materials used. Most modern cooled detectors operate in the 60 Kelvin (K) to 100 K range (-213 to -173 °C), depending on type and performance level.

Without cooling, these sensors (which detect and convert light in much the same way as common digital cameras, but are made of different materials) would be 'blinded' or flooded by their own radiation. The drawbacks of cooled infrared cameras are that they are expensive both to produce and to run. Cooling is both energy-intensive and time-consuming.

The camera may need several minutes to cool down before it can begin working. The most commonly used cooling systems are peltier coolers which, although inefficient and limited in cooling capacity, are relatively simple and compact. To obtain better image quality or for imaging low temperature objects Stirling engine cryocoolers are needed. Although the cooling apparatus may be comparatively bulky and expensive, cooled infrared cameras provide greatly superior image quality compared to uncooled ones, particularly of objects near or below room temperature. Additionally, the greater sensitivity of cooled cameras also allow the use of higher F-number lenses, making high performance long focal length lenses both smaller and cheaper for cooled detectors.

An alternative to Stirling engine coolers is to use gases bottled at high pressure, nitrogen being a common choice. The pressurised gas is expanded via a micro-sized orifice and passed over a miniature heat exchanger resulting in regenerative cooling via the Joule–Thomson effect. For such systems the supply of pressurized gas is a logistical concern for field use.

Materials used for cooled infrared detection include photodetectors based on a wide range of narrow gap semiconductors including indium antimonide (3-5 μm), indium arsenide, mercury cadmium telluride (MCT) (1-2 μm, 3-5 μm, 8-12 μm), lead sulfide, and lead selenide

Infrared photodetectors can be created with structures of high bandgap semiconductors such as in quantum well infrared photodetectors.

A number of superconducting and non-superconducting cooled bolometer technologies exist.

In principle, superconducting tunneling junction devices could be used as infrared sensors because of their very narrow gap. Small arrays have been demonstrated. They have not been broadly adopted for use because their high sensitivity requires careful shielding from the background radiation.

Superconducting detectors offer extreme sensitivity, with some able to register individual photons. For example, ESA's Superconducting camera (SCAM). However, they are not in regular use outside of scientific research.

Uncooled infrared detectors 

Uncooled thermal cameras use a sensor operating at ambient temperature, or a sensor stabilized at a temperature close to ambient using small temperature control elements. Modern uncooled detectors all use sensors that work by the change of resistance, voltage or current when heated by infrared radiation. These changes are then measured and compared to the values at the operating temperature of the sensor.

Uncooled infrared sensors can be stabilized to an operating temperature to reduce image noise, but they are not cooled to low temperatures and do not require bulky, expensive, energy consuming cryogenic coolers. This makes infrared cameras smaller and less costly. However, their resolution and image quality tend to be lower than cooled detectors. This is due to differences in their fabrication processes, limited by currently available technology. An uncooled thermal camera also needs to deal with its own heat signature.

Uncooled detectors are mostly based on pyroelectric and ferroelectric materials or microbolometer technology. The material are used to form pixels with highly temperature-dependent properties, which are thermally insulated from the environment and read electronically.

Ferroelectric detectors operate close to phase transition temperature of the sensor material; the pixel temperature is read as the highly temperature-dependent polarization charge. The achieved NETD of ferroelectric detectors with f/1 optics and 320x240 sensors is 70-80 mK. A possible sensor assembly consists of barium strontium titanate bump-bonded by polyimide thermally insulated connection.

Silicon microbolometers can reach NETD down to 20 mK. They consist of a layer of amorphous silicon, or a thin film vanadium(V) oxide sensing element suspended on silicon nitride bridge above the silicon-based scanning electronics. The electric resistance of the sensing element is measured once per frame.

Current improvements of uncooled focal plane arrays (UFPA) are focused primarily on higher sensitivity and pixel density. In 2013 DARPA announced a five-micron LWIR camera that uses a 1280 x 720 focal plane array (FPA).
Some of the materials used for the sensor arrays are amorphous silicon (a-Si), vanadium(V) oxide (VOx), lanthanum barium manganite (LBMO), lead zirconate titanate (PZT), lanthanum doped lead zirconate titanate (PLZT), lead scandium tantalate (PST), lead lanthanum titanate (PLT), lead titanate (PT), lead zinc niobate (PZN), lead strontium titanate (PSrT), barium strontium titanate (BST), barium titanate (BT), antimony sulfoiodide (SbSI), and polyvinylidene difluoride (PVDF).

Applications

Originally developed for military use during the Korean War, thermographic cameras have slowly migrated into other fields as varied as medicine and archeology. More recently, the lowering of prices has helped fuel the adoption of infrared viewing technology. Advanced optics and sophisticated software interfaces continue to enhance the versatility of IR cameras.
 Agriculture, e.g., Seed-counting machine
 Building inspection
 Fault diagnosis and troubleshooting
 Energy auditing of building insulation and detection of refrigerant leaks
 Roof inspection
 Home performance
 Moisture detection in walls and roofs (and thus in turn often part of mold remediation)
 Masonry wall structural analysis
 Law enforcement and anti-terrorism
 Quarantine monitoring of visitors to a country
 Military and police target detection and acquisition: forward-looking infrared, infrared search and track
 Condition monitoring and surveillance
 Technical surveillance counter-measures
 Thermal weapon sight
 Search and rescue operations
 Firefighting operations
 Thermography (medical) - Medical testing for diagnosis
 Veterinary thermal imaging
 Program process monitoring
 Quality control in production environments
 Predictive maintenance (early failure warning) on mechanical and electrical equipment

 Astronomy, in telescopes such as UKIRT, the Spitzer Space Telescope, WISE and the James Webb Space Telescope
 Automotive night vision
 Auditing of acoustic insulation for sound reduction
 Baby monitoring systems
 Chemical imaging
 Data center monitoring
 Electrical distribution equipment diagnosis and maintenance, such as transformer yards and distribution panels
 Nondestructive testing
 Research and development of new products
 Pollution effluent detection
 Locating pest infestations
 Aerial archaeology
 Flame detector
 Meteorology (thermal images from weather satellites are used to determine cloud temperature/height and water vapor concentrations, depending on the wavelength)
 Cricket Umpire Decision Review System. To detect faint contact of the ball with the bat (and hence a heat patch signature on the bat after contact).
 Autonomous navigation
 Malicious Applications
 Thermal Attack is an approach that exploits heat traces left after interacting with interfaces, such as touchscreens or keyboards, to uncover the user's input.
 Nighttime wildlife photography
 Inspecting photovoltaic power plants

Specifications 
Some specification parameters of an infrared camera system are number of pixels, frame rate, responsivity, noise-equivalent power, noise-equivalent temperature difference (NETD), spectral band, distance-to-spot ratio (D:S), minimum focus distance, sensor lifetime, minimum resolvable temperature difference (MRTD), field of view, dynamic range, input power, and mass and volume.

See also 

 Digital infrared thermal imaging in health care
 Hyperspectral imaging
 Infrared non-destructive testing of materials
 Infrared photography
 Ora, a 2011 3D film shot in HD thermography
 Passive infrared sensor
 Thermal imaging camera (firefighting)
 Thermal weapon sight
 Thermography

References

Cameras by type
Astronomical imaging
Surveillance
Infrared imaging
Hungarian inventions
Night vision devices